Talkback is a British television production company established in 1981 by comedy duo Mel Smith and Griff Rhys Jones.

History
Talkback was sold to Pearson Television in 2000. The company merged with Thames Television in 2003 and the combined entity was renamed Talkback Thames. On 23 November 2011, it was announced that Talkback Thames would split into four separate production companies; Boundless, Retort, Talkback and Thames.  The split took effect on 1 January 2012.
On 2 September 2018, FremantleMedia UK was renamed to simply Fremantle UK. The rebranding of the many production divisions from the company soon followed with Talkback receiving the new logo after six-and-a-half years of the old one, which was inspired by the original design from 1984 since its launch whilst retaining the green colour the company has been associated with since 2003, when it merged with Thames to form Talkback Thames. It was designed in-house.

Productions
 Alan Carr's Epic Gameshow (ITV, 2020–present)
 Alas Smith and Jones (BBC One & BBC Two, 1991–1998; Sketchbook: BBC One, 2006)
 Bernard and the Genie (BBC One, 1991)
 Big Train (BBC Two, 1998–2002)
 Bonjour la Classe (BBC One, 1993)
 Brass Eye (Channel 4, 1997–2001)
 Celebrity Juice (ITV2, 2008–2022)
 Da Ali G Show (Channel 4, 2000–2004; HBO, 2003–2004)
 Demob (ITV, 1993)
 Distraction (Channel 4, 2003–2004)
 Friends and Crocodiles (BBC One, 2006)
 Gash (Channel 4, 2003)
 Gideon's Daughter (BBC One, 2006)
 Green Wing (Channel 4, 2004–2007)
 Hippies (BBC Two, 1999)
 House Doctor (Channel 5, 1998–2003)
 I'm Alan Partridge (BBC Two, 1997–2002)
 In A Land Of Plenty (BBC Two, 2000)
 Jam (Channel 4, 2000)
 Jamie's Kitchen (Channel 4, 2002)
 Keith Lemon's LemonAid (ITV, 2012)
 Knowing Me, Knowing You... with Alan Partridge (BBC Two, 1994–1995)
 Lemon La Vida Loca (ITV2, 2012–2013)
 Look Around You (BBC Two, 2002–2005)
 Los Dos Bros (Channel 4, 2001) 
 Meet Ricky Gervais (Channel 4, 2000)
 Monkey Dust (BBC Three,  2003–2005)
 Murder Most Horrid (BBC Two, 1991–1999)
 Nathan Barley (Channel 4, 2005)
 Never Mind the Buzzcocks (BBC Two, 1996–2015; Sky Max, 2021–present)
 Perfect Strangers (BBC Two, 2001)
 QI (BBC Four, 2003–2008; BBC Two, 2003–2008 & 2011–present; BBC One, 2009–2011)
 Shooting the Past (BBC Two, 1999)
 Shoreditch Twat (Channel 4, 2002)
 Smack the Pony (Channel 4, 1999–2003)
 Sweat the Small Stuff (BBC Three, 2013–2015)
 Sword of Honour (Channel 4, 2001)
 The 11 O'Clock Show (Channel 4, 1998–2000)
 The Armando Iannucci Shows (Channel 4, 2001)
 The Day Today (BBC Two, 1994)
 The Keith & Paddy Picture Show (ITV, 2017–2018)
 The Keith Lemon Sketch Show (ITV2, 2015–2016)
 The Lost Prince (BBC One, 2003)
 The Sex Inspectors (Channel 4, 2004)
 They Think It's All Over (BBC One, 1995–2006)
 Through the Keyhole (ITV, 2013–2019) 
 Too Hot to Handle (Netflix, 2020–2021)
 Virtually Famous (E4, 2014–2017)
 Would Like to Meet (BBC Two, 2001–2004)
 Your Face or Mine? (E4, 2002–2003; Comedy Central, 2017–2019)

See also

 List of television production companies
 Talkback Thames

References

External links
 .

British companies established in 1981

Performing arts in London
Television production companies of the United Kingdom
RTL Group